Iron loss may refer to:
 Core loss in electrical machines
 A cause of iron deficiency in living organisms